This is a list of bounty hunters.

List

See also
 List of fictional assassins and bounty hunters
 Nazi hunter

References

External links